Ytteren is a village in the municipality of Rana in Nordland county, Norway. Ytteren and the neighboring village of Båsmoen are northern suburbs of the town of Mo i Rana. They are both located on the northern edge of the mouth of the Ranelva river at the Ranfjorden. Norwegian County Road 12 runs through the village.

The village was the old administrative centre of the municipality of Nord-Rana which existed from 1839 until 1964. Ytteren Church is located in the village.  The local sports club is Bossmo & Ytteren IL.

References

External links

Rana, Norway
Villages in Nordland